Love Parade is the fifth studio album from Japanese girl group Gang Parade. It was released on November 13, 2019, by Fueled By Mentaiko and consists of eleven tracks.

Track listing
All music composed by Kenta Matsukuma.

Charts

References

2019 albums
Japanese-language albums